Saint Regis Mountain is a  mountain in the town of Santa Clara, New York, in Franklin County at the center of the Saint Regis Canoe Area in the Adirondack Park.

It can be climbed from a trailhead on Keese Mills Road in Keese Mill, west of Paul Smiths. The trail is a gradual 3.3 mile ascent with a gain of 1168 feet.

The view from the summit includes thirty lakes, including the Upper and Lower Saranac Lake, and Upper and Lower Saint Regis Lake. The Adirondack High Peaks can also be seen.

The summit is bare rock, having been cleared by a fire started accidentally by a surveying party led by Verplanck Colvin in 1876. The St. Regis Mountain Fire Observation Station is at the summit was restored in 2016 and is now open to the public.

Gallery

References

Mountains of Franklin County, New York
Adirondacks
Mountains of New York (state)